Molineriella is a genus of flowering plants belonging to the family Poaceae.

Its native range is Mediterranean Europe. It is found in the countries and regions of Albania, Algeria, Bulgaria, Corsica, East Aegean Islands, France, Greece, Italy, Crete, Crimea, Morocco, Portugal, Sardegna, Spain, Turkey and Yugoslavia.

The genus name of Molineriella is in honour of Ignazio Bernardo Molineri (1741–1818), an Italian head gardener at a botanical garden in Turin. 
It was first described and published in G.Rouy & J.Foucaud, Fl. France Vol.14 on page 102 in 1913.

Known species
According to Kew;

References

Poaceae
Plants described in 1913
Flora of Europe
Flora of Morocco
Poaceae genera